Theretra griseomarginata is a moth of the  family Sphingidae. It is known from India.

The antenna are long, reaching beyond the apex of the forewing discal cell. The abdomen upperside has a single, narrow longitudinal white line. The forewing upperside has a diagnostic whitish submarginal band that runs nearly straight from the apex to near the tornus.

References

Theretra
Moths described in 1898